Francis Alexander Shields Jr. (May 16, 1941 – April 25, 2003) was an American businessman and an executive at Revlon in New York City. He was the father of actress Brooke Shields.

Early life
Shields was born in New York City. He was the eldest son of Francis Xavier Alexander Sr., a top-ranking American tennis player and Davis Cup winner, and Italian Princess Donna Marina Torlonia di Civitella-Cesi. After his parents' divorce, his father married Katharine Mortimer in 1949. 

He attended the Buckley School in Manhattan and St. Paul's School in Concord, New Hampshire. He attended in the University of Pennsylvania. While at Penn, he captained the crew that rowed in the Henley Royal Regatta in 1962 and was a member of St. Anthony Hall.

Career
Shields started his career with Loeb Rhoades. He then worked in sales and marketing for Revlon and Estee Lauder. He also worked for Handy Associates, an executive recruiting firm in New York City. 

He formed his own real estate firm, Frank Shields Associates, in Palm Beach, Florida in 1989.

Personal life
In 1964, Shields married Maria Theresia "Teri" Schmon. They had a daughter, Brooke Christa Shields in 1965. In 1966, they divorced when their daughter was then five months old:

In 1970, he married Diana "Didi" Lippert, former wife of Thomas Gore Auchincloss. They had three daughters: Marina Torlonia Shields, Olympia Torlonia Shields, and Christina Torlonia Shields.

An avid hunter and fisherman, Shields spent much of his free time at Canoe Creek, the camp he owned in rural west Florida. He was a member of The Brook, The Back and Tennis Club, Piping Rock Club, and The Racquet and Tennis Club. In 1980, Shields founded the Power Ten, a New York nonprofit organization that supports youth rowing and makes contributions to the U.S. National rowing team and U.S. Olympic rowing team through the National Rowing Foundation and Row New York.

In 2003, Shields died in Palm Beach, Florida, of a "protracted illness" at the age of 61. After his death, the National Rowing Foundation offered the Frank Shields Fellowships.

References

1941 births
2003 deaths
Deaths from cancer in Florida
Deaths from prostate cancer
House of Torlonia
American people of Italian descent
Businesspeople from New York City
St. Paul's School (New Hampshire) alumni
University of Pennsylvania alumni